Naseem Garden is a large park between Seeb and Barka, near Muscat, Oman. It contains an aquarium, lake, waterfall, Arabic and Japanese gardens, a maze and a playground.

References

Seeb
Gardens in Oman